Tadeusz Drzazga (born August 7, 1975 in Wałcz, Zachodniopomorskie) is a retired male weightlifter from Poland. He competed for his native country at the 2004 Summer Olympics in Athens, Greece, finishing in 13th place in the men's middle-heavyweight division (– 94 kg). Drzazga is best known for winning the silver medal at the 1997 World Weightlifting Championships in the men's heavyweight class (– 91 kg).

References
sports-reference

1975 births
Living people
Polish male weightlifters
Olympic weightlifters of Poland
Weightlifters at the 2004 Summer Olympics
People from Wałcz
Sportspeople from West Pomeranian Voivodeship
European Weightlifting Championships medalists
World Weightlifting Championships medalists
20th-century Polish people
21st-century Polish people